Česká Bělá is a market town in Havlíčkův Brod District in the Vysočina Region of the Czech Republic. It has about 1,100 inhabitants.

Administrative parts
The village of Cibotín is an administrative part of Česká Bělá.

References

Populated places in Havlíčkův Brod District
Market towns in the Czech Republic